GingerMan Raceway is a road course located east of the town of South Haven in Southwest Michigan, United States.

Built in 1995, the track opened for its first full season of racing sports cars and motorcycles in 1996. 

The Gridlife festival is held at the venue since 2014.

Track Layout 
The track is the recipient of the Safe Track Award from Victory Lane Magazine, and was designed by architect Alan Wilson for use as a club racing course with clear runoffs and wide, smooth paving to avoid costly vehicle damage, especially for newer drivers.

The  road course is specifically designed for driver safety, especially for amateur drivers. The circuit update during the 2009 - 2010 off season included an addition to Turn 10 (now 10A) of 1,770 feet of pavement, bringing the course to 2.21 miles. Safety runoff areas were configured to allow counter-race operation. Spectators can watch the races from numerous areas.

Experienced racers and track day drivers consider GingerMan one of the safest road race tracks in the region.

References

External links
 GingerMan Raceway, Ltd.
 Trackpedia guide to driving this track
 1tail Resource Database: Gingerman Raceway

Motorsport venues in Michigan
Buildings and structures in Van Buren County, Michigan
Tourist attractions in Van Buren County, Michigan
Sports venues completed in 1996
1996 establishments in Michigan
Road courses in the United States